Axial may refer to:

 one of the anatomical directions describing relationships in an animal body
 In geometry:
 a geometric term of location
 an axis of rotation
 In chemistry, referring to an axial bond
 a type of modal frame, in music
 axial-flow, a type of fan
 the Axial age in China, India, etc.
 Axial Seamount and submarine volcano off Oregon, USA
 Axial, Colorado, a ghost town

See also
Axiality (disambiguation)
Axis (disambiguation)